Big Guns is a 2018 satirical novel by former U.S. Representative from New York Steve Israel.  It tells the story of a fictitious arms manufacturer, Cogsworth International, fighting American anti-firearm legislation with a proposal that every American be required to own a gun.

References

2018 American novels
American satirical novels
Political satire books
Works about gun politics in the United States
Simon & Schuster books